The Israeli Network is a Canadian exempt Category B Hebrew language specialty channel. It is wholly owned by Ethnic Channels Group, with its name used under license from the owners of the Israeli-based TV channel, The Israeli Network.

Programming
The Israeli Network broadcasts a wide variety of programming including news, current affairs, dramas, and sports primarily from The Israeli Network. The Israeli-based Israeli Network itself sources much of its programming from Channel One, Channel 2, Sport 5, and Hop TV.

History

In November 2004, Ethnic Channels Group was granted approval from the Canadian Radio-television and Telecommunications Commission (CRTC) to launch a television channel called Israeli TV 1, described as "a national ethnic Category 2 specialty programming undertaking of general interest and devoted to the Hebrew-speaking community."

The channel launched in December 2005 as The Israeli Network initially exclusively on Rogers Cable.

On October 16, 2014, the CRTC approved Ethnic Channels Group's request to convert The Israeli Network from a licensed Category B specialty service to an exempted Cat. B third language service.

References

External links
 The Israeli Network Canada
 The Israeli Network 

Digital cable television networks in Canada
Jews and Judaism in Toronto
Television channels and stations established in 2006
Canada–Israel relations
Israeli Canadian
Middle Eastern television in Canada